George A Speckert  (* 1951 in St. Louis, Missouri, United States) is an American composer, music educator, school principal, author, violist and teacher for film music and media.

Vita 
George A. Speckert studied at the University of Evansville of which he spent a time at Harlaxton Campus. He studied viola with  Gerald Fischbach and Irene Breslau. He graduated with a Bachelor of Arts  cum laude in 1973. In addition he studied composition with Brian Blyth Daubney. His minor was piano.

He participated on master workshops including string pedagogy (Paul Rolland) and Baroque Stylistic (Eduard Melkus) and composition (John Corigliano).

In the 1970s Speckert went to Germany, where he started at the community music school in Bünde-Westfalen (North Germany). In 1976 he was appointed director of the City Music School in Löhne-Westfalen. Four years later he advanced to the City Music School in Bad Salzuflen. In 1984 he was appointed assistant director of the City Music School in Hannover, which he later directed.

In anticipation of the World’s Fair Expo 2000 in Hannover George A. Speckert was awarded the Hannover-Prize in 1996 by Birgit Breuel for his concept “Kulturkaleidoskop – made in Hannover.” In 1998 he was commissioned to organize it. Among other things he developed the first website for the City of Hannover, so that the events could be viewed and booked worldwide.

After the EXPO 2000 Speckert taught multimedia at the community college of Hannover including vocational training, eLearning and a project for schools, community centers and organizations called “Mediabus.” In 2011 the Congress of the Council of Europe awarded his project with the European Award of Excellence City for Children.

In 2002 Speckert started teaching “film music” at the University of Offenburg. Speckert was elected the head of the exam board for digital media design in Hannover in 2005. From 2008 to 2013 he taught multimedia at the University of Bielefeld.

Publications (selection)

Books (in German language) 
 Hugo Spechtshart – ars nova. Die Entdeckung der Neuen Musik. Eine rekonstruierte Biographie.
 KulturKaleidoskop - made in Hannover : Alternativkultur im Rückenwind der EXPO2000, 1. Auflage, Hamburg: tredition, 2017,  und ; table of contents

Books (in English language) 
 Just Another Immigrant: A reconstructed biography, 2016,  and 
 The First Generation Americans, 2017,  and 
 Heritage Songs of the Ethical Society, 2017,  and 
 A High Price for Peace: A common man's account of the 30 Years War, 2018,  and

Music editions 
 Ostinati. Spass am Klavier, Probieren, Improvisieren, Fantasieren, Verwandeln. Zimmermann, Frankfurt am Main, ca. 1986
 Indian chants for strings (= Indian chants für Streicher), Kassel [u.a.]: Bärenreiter-Verlag, 2007, ISMN M-006-53426-5 
 Tango for strings, Partitur und Stimmen für Tantalizing tango. The smell of tango. Monster tango. The daring white of her eyes. Pizz-a-tango. Roses and thorns. Bärenreiter-Verlag, Kassel [u.a.] 2008, ISMN M-006-53730-3
 Ready to Play. Popular Movie Hits, Bärenreiter-Verlag: Kassel et al., 2012, ISNM 9790006541928

Records 
 Requiem for a World After, Daviton, 1981

Film music 
 Secret Places, University of Evansville, Harlaxton, 2016 
 Imagefilm, University of Offenburg, 2014
 Trailer for the film festival up-and-coming, 2013
 Doping in Weinkeller, Behring Filmproduktion, Bayerischer Rundfunk, Norddeutscher Rundfunk, 2003

References 

1951 births
Living people
American classical violists
American music educators
20th-century classical composers
21st-century classical composers
American male classical composers
American classical composers
American male film score composers
American film score composers
University of Evansville alumni
21st-century American composers
People from Herford (district)
People from Bad Salzuflen
People from Hanover
Expo 2000
Offenburg
Academic staff of Bielefeld University
20th-century American composers
20th-century American male musicians
21st-century American male musicians
20th-century violists
21st-century violists